= Emmanuelle Mouké =

Ivorian basketball player

Personal information
- Born: December 3, 1984 (age 41)

Career history
- ?: Assaoufoué

Emmanuelle Mouké (born December 3, 1984) is an Ivorian female professional basketball player.
